Soul on Fire is a 2005 album by KMC and the title track.

Soul on Fire may also refer to:

"Soul on Fire", a song by LaVern Baker from her self-titled debut album, 1953
"Soul on Fire", a song by HIM from the album Love Metal, 2004
"Soul on Fire", a song by Spiritualized from the album Songs in A&E, 2008
"Soul on Fire", a song by Third Day featuring All Sons & Daughters from the album Lead Us Back: Songs of Worship